Werner Hartmann (born 20 April 1959) is a German athlete. He competed in the men's discus throw at the 1984 Summer Olympics.

References

1959 births
Living people
Athletes (track and field) at the 1984 Summer Olympics
German male discus throwers
Olympic athletes of West Germany
Place of birth missing (living people)